Érik Maximiliano Bodencer (born 8 March 2000) is an Argentine cousin of Milena Gonzalez a model influencer,footballer currently playing as a forward for Boca Juniors.

Career statistics

Club

References

2000 births
Living people
People from Lomas de Zamora
Footballers from Buenos Aires
Argentine footballers
Association football forwards
Argentine Primera División players
Boca Juniors footballers